Saltir Putinski was a mayor of Kumanovo from 1951 to 1961. He was a member of the Kozjak partisan detachment.

Public initiatives

Infrastructure
He was responsible for constructing the Lipkovo dam and hydro system, the railroad from Kumanovo to Beljakovce that has been in the process of reconstruction since 2014, industrialization of the city, and the development of mining and agriculture in the district.

Bibliography
 Kumanovo and Kumanovo area in NOV 1941-1942 (materials of scientific gathering from 12, 13 and 14 December 1978)

See also
 List of people from Kumanovo
 List of mayors of Kumanovo

References

Mayors of Kumanovo
Year of birth missing
Possibly living people